Tell Khaiber is a tell, or archaeological settlement mound, in southern Mesopotamia (modern-day Iraq). It is located thirteen kilometers west of the modern city of Nasiriyah, about 19 kilometers northwest of the ancient city of Ur in Dhiq Qar Province and 25 kilometers south of the ancient city of Larsa. In 2012, the site was visited by members of the Ur Region Archaeology Project (URAP), a cooperation between the British Institute for the Study of Iraq, the University of Manchester and the Iraqi State Board for Antiquities and Heritage. They found that the site had escaped looting, and applied for an excavation permit.

History
Very little is known about the Sealand Dynasty. Traditionally it was thought to exist roughly between 1700 and 1400 BC and to have replaced Babylon after its fall sometime around 1550 BC. Tell Khaiber is the first Sealand site excavated. It has been dated to circa 1500 BC. Pottery shards from earlier periods including Late Uruk and Jemdet Nasr were widely found on the site but pre-second millenium remains are below the current water table.

Archaeology
The site consists of two mounds designated as Tell Khaiber 1 and Tell Khaiber 2 (sometimes called Tell Gurra), both roughly 300 x 250 meters in area. Most of the Tell Khaiber 1 occupation is from the Sealand Dynasty period but pottery fragments from the Ubaid, Jemdet Nasr, and Early Dynastic periods were also found. Three baked bricks stamped with Ur III king Amar-Sin are thought to be imported from another site. Tell Khaiber 2 dates to the Kassite period. They lay on an ancient branch of the Euphrates River.

The two mounds were first identified in an area survey by Henry Wright in 1965, naming them Ishan Khaiber (site 60) and Tell Gurra (site 61). In the 1976 Iraqi Directorate of Antiquities atlas of archaeological sites both mounds were named Ishan Khaiber (sites 107 and 108).
Between 2013 and 2017, the site was excavated by a team of Iraqi and British archaeologists. The excavations revealed the presence of a settlement dominated by a large administrative building dating to c. 1500 BCE, or the Middle Bronze Age. The building, 53 meters by 83 meters (53m × 27.5m in its initial phase), covered 4400 square meters and was surrounded by 3.5 m thick walls, with large towers having meter-thick walls,  pierced by a single gate. Among the finds from this building was an archive of 152 clay tablets and fragments, after joins were made. Excavated tablets from the Sealand Dynasty are uncommon but a number of unprovenances tablets in various institutions have been identified by Stephanie Dalley. The tablets were written in Akkadian, though some Sumerian language school tablets were also found, and deal mostly with the administration of agricultural activities. Some of the tablets contained dates ("Year: Aya-dara-galama became king"), which indicated that the building was in use during the reign of Ayadaragalama, the eighth king of the Sealand Dynasty. Three private homes lying southeast of the public building were also investigated. A stratified sequence for 1st Sealand ceramics was also developed.

See also
Cities of the ancient Near East

References

Sources
 
Dalley, Stephanie, "The First Sealand Dynasty: Literacy, Economy, and the Likely Location of Dūr-Enlil (ē) in Southern Mesopotamia at the end of the Old Babylonian Period", In S. Paulus & T. Clayden (Ed.), Babylonia under the Sealand and Kassite Dynasties, pp. 9-27, De Gruyter, 2020

External links
Tell Khaiber tablet corpus at Upenn
ASOR ANE Today article on Tell Khaiber 2018
UK and Iraqi archaeologists work to preserve the past
Facebook page for the dig

Khaiber
Khaiber
Tells (archaeology)
Bronze Age Asia